Affluenza is a term used by critics of consumerism.

Affluenza may also refer to:

Affluenza: The All-Consuming Epidemic, 2001 book by John de Graaf
Affluenza: When Too Much is Never Enough, 2005 book written by Clive Hamilton and Richard Denniss
Affluenza, 2007 book by Oliver James
Affluenza (film), 2014 American drama film
"Affluenza", song by Conan Gray from the 2020 album Kid Krow
"Affluenza", song by Theory of a Deadman from their 2020 album Say Nothing